Microstrophia nana is a species of small, air-breathing land snail, a terrestrial pulmonate gastropod mollusk in the family Streptaxidae.

This species is endemic to Mauritius.

References

Streptaxidae
Gastropods described in 1936
Taxonomy articles created by Polbot
Endemic fauna of Mauritius
Taxa named by Alfred James Peile